The Progressive Conservative Party of New Brunswick is a centre-right, conservative political party in the Canadian province of New Brunswick. The party has its origins in the pre-Canadian confederation Conservative Party that opposed the granting of responsible government to the colony. It has historically followed the Red Tory tradition. The Progressive Conservative Party currently leads the provincial government since 2018 under Premier Blaine Higgs.

History

Initially, Conservative supporters tended to be United Empire Loyalists and supporters of the business community. In the 1860s, both the Conservative and Liberal parties split over the issue of Canadian confederation, and were replaced by the Confederation Party and the Anti-Confederation Party. By 1870, the pro-Confederation party became generally known as the Liberal-Conservatives or just "Conservatives", and were aligned with the national Conservative Party of Sir John A. Macdonald.

The party was aligned with the historic federal Conservative party. When the federal party changed its name to the Progressive Conservative Party of Canada in 1942, the New Brunswick party did the same. The federal Progressive Conservative Party dissolved in 2003, to merge with the Canadian Alliance and a new Conservative Party of Canada was created. The provincial party has no formal link with the current federal Conservative Party, but several of its members and elected MLAs, including former premier Premier Lord, publicly endorsed the federal party and in some cases its candidates in the 2004, 2006, 2008, 2011 and 2015 federal elections.

Following the change of government in 2006 provincial election, Bernard Lord resigned as leader on December 13, 2006, and as the member of Moncton East. On December 19, Jeannot Volpé, MLA for Madawaska les Lacs-Edmundston, was selected as interim leader. On October 18, 2008, David Alward, MLA for Carleton, was elected leader of the party at the Progressive Conservative Party of New Brunswick Leadership Convention in Fredericton. Alward beat his only opponent, Robert MacLeod, by a margin of 2,269 votes to 1,760.

The Progressive Conservatives won a sweeping majority, with 42 of 55 seats in the 2010 provincial election. In doing so, PC party leader David Alward became the 32nd Premier of New Brunswick.

In 2013, Saint John area MLA Dr. Jim Parrott, a retired heart surgeon and former head of the New Brunswick Heart Centre, was kicked out of the caucus after criticizing his government over health issues.

The controversial backbencher had spoken out about bilingualism and duality, and written a newspaper commentary about a lack of consultation with physicians. Before the 2014 election, he was allowed to return

Alward's government was defeated after one term in the 2014 provincial election, after which Alward announced his resignation as party leader. On October 18, 2014, Bruce Fitch was selected as interim leader of the party and Leader of the Opposition of New Brunswick.

2016 to present
Quispamsis MLA Blaine Higgs was elected leader of the Progressive Conservative Party on October 22, 2016, defeating former Saint John Mayor Mel Norton, 1,563 to 1,169 on the third ballot.

In the 2018 provincial election, Higgs and the PCs won the largest share of seats in the legislature, 22, compared to 21 for the governing Liberal Party of New Brunswick, which opted to attempt to remain in power as a minority government by presenting a Throne Speech in hopes of retaining the confidence of the Legislative Assembly of New Brunswick.

On November 2, 2018, the Progressive Conservatives and the People's Alliance combined to defeat Premier Brian Gallant's Liberal minority government via a non-confidence vote in the legislature.

Higgs was appointed Premier on November 9, 2018. Higgs and the Progressive Conservatives were re-elected to a majority government in the 2020 provincial election held on September 14, 2020

On March 30, 2022, Kris Austin and Michelle Conroy announced their departure from the People's Alliance of New Brunswick to join the Progressive Conservative Party of New Brunswick.

Ideology and electoral base
The Tories have alternated power with the New Brunswick Liberal Association since Confederation. The party tends to hold a moderate Red Tory stance, being socially and fiscally centrist.

For most of New Brunswick's history, the party had greater support among English speakers, while the Liberals were more popular among Acadians. However, initiatives by the governments of Richard Hatfield and Bernard Lord to include Acadians in the mainstream of New Brunswick life helped the party make inroads in Acadia. In fact, even though he was born in Quebec, former Premier Bernard Lord is widely perceived to be an Acadian, due to his Francophone heritage and the fact that he was raised in Moncton where he attended French language schools and university.

Election results

Current members of the legislature

Party leaders

 Peter Mitchell (1866–1867)
 Andrew R. Wetmore (1867–1870)
 George Edwin King (1870–1871)
 George L. Hathaway (1871–1872)
 George Edwin King (1872–1878)
 John James Fraser (1878–1882)
 Daniel L. Hanington (1882–1892)
 Alfred Augustus Stockton (1892–1899)
 John Douglas Hazen (1899–1911)
 James Kidd Flemming (1911–1914)
 George Johnson Clarke (1914–1917)
 James Alexander Murray (1917–1920)
 John B. M. Baxter (1920–1921)
 Charles D. Richards (1921–1925)
 John B. M. Baxter (1925–1931)
 Charles D. Richards (1931–1933)
 Leonard P. D. Tilley (1933–1935)
 Frederick C. Squires (1935–1939)
 Hugh H. Mackay (1939–1948)
 Hugh John Flemming (1948–1960) (House leader 1948–1951)
 Cyril Sherwood (1960–1966)
 Charles Van Horne (1966–1967)
 Richard Hatfield (1967–1987) (House leader 1967–1969)
 Malcolm MacLeod (1987–1989) (interim)
 Barbara Baird Filliter (1989–1991)
 Dennis Cochrane (1991–1995)
 Bernard Valcourt (1995–1997)
 Bernard Lord (1997–2007)
 Jeannot Volpé (2007–2008) (interim)
 David Alward (2008–2014)
 Bruce Fitch (2014–2016) (interim)
 Blaine Higgs (2016–present)

See also
List of premiers of New Brunswick
List of New Brunswick political parties
Progressive Conservative Party of New Brunswick leadership elections

References

 
Provincial political parties in New Brunswick
Conservative parties in Canada
1867 establishments in New Brunswick
Political parties established in 1867
Organizations based in Fredericton